Joshua Labove (born March 22, 1986 in Manhasset, New York) has often been credited in TV and film performances as a child actor in the late 1980s and 1990s.

He has had TV roles on One Life to Live, ER, The Magic School Bus, and All That, and the Daniel Day-Lewis remake of The Crucible.  Labove also voiced the Burger King Kids Club mascot Kid Vid and appeared in over 500 television commercials, including the infamous Watermelon Jello commercial with Bill Cosby.

Labove has been member of the British Academy of Film and Television Arts, the Screen Actors Guild, and finally also the American Federation of Television and Radio Artists.

Labove attended University of Chicago and graduated with a Bachelor of Arts with Honors in Political Science and Religious Studies in 2007. During his college years, Labove was a member of the Illinois Mu Chapter of Sigma Phi Epsilon and served as an alumni mentor for his home chapter. While at Chicago, Josh was active in the Chicago Weekly newspaper on campus and lived near the University of Chicago campus in the Hyde Park neighborhood of Chicago. After graduating from Chicago, Josh worked as an Assistant Director of Admissions and Director of Publications in the Office of College of Admissions at the University of Chicago and more recently as  the Director of College Counseling at Louisville Collegiate School. Josh was a graduate student at Dartmouth College in Hanover, New Hampshire and is now a PhD candidate in the Department of Geography and a lecturer in Continuing Studies at Simon Fraser University in British Columbia.

External links 

1986 births
American male child actors
American male film actors
American male soap opera actors
American male television actors
American male voice actors
American expatriates in Canada
American expatriates in England
Living people
People from Manhasset, New York
Male actors from Chicago
Male actors from Louisville, Kentucky
Male actors from New Hampshire
University of Chicago alumni
Dartmouth College alumni
Simon Fraser University alumni